Wang Zhijun (born September 1965) is a Chinese politician, currently serving as deputy party secretary of Heilongjiang.

He is a representative of the 20th National Congress of the Chinese Communist Party and a member of the 20th Central Committee of the Chinese Communist Party.

Biography
Wang was born in Hohhot, Inner Mongolia, in September 1965.

Wang served in the National Development and Reform Commission, the State Energy Office and the Central Finance and Economic Affairs Commission.

Wang was promoted to vice minister of Industry and Information Technology in January 2019.

In April 2022, Wang was transferred to northeast China's Heilongjiang province and appointed deputy party secretary, and was admitted to member of the Standing Committee of the CCP Heilongjiang Provincial Committee, the province's top authority.

References

1965 births
Living people
People from Hohhot
People's Republic of China politicians from Inner Mongolia
Chinese Communist Party politicians from Inner Mongolia
Members of the 20th Central Committee of the Chinese Communist Party